Goulash is a soup or stew of meat and vegetables seasoned with paprika and other spices. Originating in Hungary, goulash is a common meal predominantly eaten in Central Europe but also in other parts of Europe. It is one of the national dishes of Hungary and a symbol of the country.

Its origin may be traced back as far as the 10th century, to stews eaten by Hungarian shepherds. At that time, the cooked and flavored meat was dried with the help of the sun and packed into bags produced from sheep's stomachs, needing only water to make it into a meal. Earlier versions of goulash did not include paprika, as it was not introduced to Europe until the 16th century.

Etymology

The name originates from the Hungarian  . The word  means 'herd of cattle' in Hungarian, and  means 'herdsman' or 'cowboy'.

The word  originally meant only 'herdsman', but over time the dish became  ('goulash meat') – that is to say, a meat dish which was prepared by herdsmen. In medieval times, the Hungarian herdsman of Central Europe made use of every possible part of the animal, as was common practice. As meat was scarce, nearly all of the animal was often used to make the soup.

Today,  refers both to the herdsmen, and to the soup. From the Middle Ages until well into the 19th century, the Puszta was the home of enormous herds of cattle. They were driven, in their tens of thousands, to Europe's biggest cattle markets in Moravia, Vienna, Nuremberg and Venice.

In Hungary

These dishes can be made as soups rather than stews. Garlic, caraway seed, and wine are optional. Excepting , the Hungarian stews do not rely on flour or roux for thickening.
Tomato is a modern addition, totally unknown in the original recipe and in the whole Central European food culture until the first half of the 20th century.

Goulash can be prepared from beef, veal, pork, or lamb.  Typical cuts include the shank, shin, or shoulder; as a result, goulash derives its thickness from tough, well-exercised muscles rich in collagen, which is converted to gelatin during the cooking process. Meat is cut into chunks, seasoned with salt, and then browned with sliced onion in a pot with oil or lard. Paprika is added, along with water or stock, and the goulash is left to simmer. After cooking a while, garlic, whole or ground caraway seed, or soup vegetables like carrot, parsley root, peppers (green or bell pepper) and celery may be added. Other herbs and spices could also be added, especially cayenne, bay leaf and thyme. Diced potatoes may be added, since they provide starch as they cook, which makes the goulash thicker and smoother. However, red peppers and potatoes are post-16th century additions, unknown in the original recipe. A small amount of white wine or wine vinegar may also be added near the end of cooking to round the taste. Goulash may be served with small egg noodles called . The name  comes from pinching small, fingernail-sized bits out of the dough ( being Hungarian for 'pinch') before adding them to the boiling soup.

The Hungarian cook Karoly Gundel maintains that in a goulash recipe, meat should not be mixed with any grains or with potatoes.

Hungarian varieties

Hungarian goulash variations include:
 Székely Gulyás. Omit the potatoes and add sauerkraut and sour cream.
 Gulyás Hungarian Plain Style. Omit the homemade soup pasta (csipetke) and add vegetables.
 Mock Gulyás. Substitute beef bones for the meat and add vegetables. Also called Hamisgulyás, (Fake Goulash)
 Bean Gulyás. Omit the potatoes and the caraway seeds. Use kidney beans instead.
 Csángó Gulyás. Add sauerkraut instead of pasta and potatoes.
 Betyár Gulyás. Use smoked beef or smoked pork for meat.
 Likócsi Pork Gulyás. Use pork and thin vermicelli in the goulash instead of potato and soup pasta. Flavour with lemon juice.
 Mutton Gulyás or Birkagulyás. Made with mutton. Add red wine for flavour.
A thicker and richer goulash, similar to a stew, originally made with three kinds of meat, is called Székely gulyás, named after the Hungarian writer, journalist and archivist József Székely (1825–1895).

Paprikás krumpli
"Paprikás krumpli" is a traditional paprika-based potato stew with diced potatoes, onion, ground paprika, and some bacon or sliced spicy sausage, like the smoked Debrecener, in lieu of beef.

In German-speaking countries this inexpensive peasant stew is made with sausage and known as Kartoffelgulasch ("potato goulash").  Bell pepper is sometimes added.

Outside Hungary
Thick stews similar to pörkölt and the original cattlemen stew are popular throughout almost all the former Austrian-Hungarian Empire, from Northeast Italy to the Carpathians. Like pörkölt, these stews are generally served with boiled or mashed potato, polenta, dumplings (e.g. nokedli, or galuska), spätzle or, alternatively, as a stand-alone dish with bread. Romani people have their own version of goulash.

Albania
Goulash (Albanian: gullash) is considered a traditional dish among some Northern Albanians.

Austria

In Vienna, the former center of the Austro-Hungarian Empire, a special kind of goulash had been developed. The Wiener Saftgulasch or the Fiakergulasch (Fiacre being a horse-drawn cab) on the menu in traditional restaurants is a rich pörkölt-like stew; more onions but no tomatoes or other vegetables are used, and it usually comes just with dark bread. A variation of the Wiener Saftgulasch is the Fiakergulasch, which is served with fried egg, fried sausage, and dumplings named Semmelknödel.

Belgium
In Belgium Goulash is eaten as a stew, usually accompanied by french fries or another potato dish. Even in the Friture you can often order homemade Goulash to eat with your french fries

Croatia
Goulash is also very popular in most parts of Croatia, especially north (Hrvatsko Zagorje) and Lika. In Gorski Kotar and Lika, venison or wild boar frequently replace beef (lovački gulaš). There is also a kind of goulash with porcini mushrooms (gulaš od vrganja). Bacon is an important ingredient.

Gulaš is often served with fuži, njoki, polenta or pasta. It is augmented with vegetables. Green and red bell peppers and carrots are most commonly used. Sometimes one or more other kinds of meat are added, e.g., pork loin, bacon, or mutton.

Czech Republic and Slovakia

In the Czech Republic and Slovakia, goulash (Czech and Slovak: guláš) is usually made with beef, although pork varieties exist, and served with boiled or steamed bread dumplings (goulash with beef in Czech hovězí guláš s knedlíkem, in Slovak hovädzí guláš s knedľou), in Slovakia more typically with bread. In pubs it is often garnished with slices of fresh onion, and is typically accompanied by beer. Beer can be also added to the stew in the process of cooking. Seasonal varieties of goulash include venison or wild boar goulashes. Another popular variant of guláš is segedínský guláš (Székelygulyás), with sauerkraut.

In Czech and Slovak slang, the word guláš means "mishmash", typically used as mít v tom guláš: to be disoriented or to lack understanding of something.

Ethiopia
Fish goulash (asa gulaš) is a popular dish in Ethiopia, particularly during the numerous fasting seasons as required by the Ethiopian Orthodox Church. It is usually prepared with a spicy sauce having a tomato and onion base and served with injera or rice.

Germany

German Gulasch is either a beef (Rindergulasch), pork (Schweinegulasch), venison (Hirschgulasch), or wild boar (Wildschweingulasch) stew that may include red wine and is usually served with potatoes (in the north), white rice or spirelli noodles (mostly in canteens), and dumplings (in the south). Gulaschsuppe (goulash soup) is the same concept served as a soup, usually with pieces of white bread.

Italy
Goulash in Italy is eaten in the autonomous regions of Friuli-Venezia Giulia and Trentino-Alto Adige/Südtirol, that once had been part of the Austro-Hungarian Empire. It is eaten as a regular Sunday dish. It can also, although less typically so, be found in the nearby Veneto. An interesting regional recipe comes from the Pustertal (Val Pusteria, Puster Valley) in South Tyrol. It is made of beef and red wine, and seasoned with rosemary, red paprika, bay leaf, marjoram and lemon zest, served with crusty white bread or polenta. Goulash is also quite popular in the city of Ancona, which is culturally quite near to eastern Europe.

Netherlands
In the Netherlands, goulash is usually prepared with beef. It is typically consumed as a stew, and is thus closer to pörkölt.

Poland

In Poland, goulash is eaten in most parts of the country. A variant dish exists that is similar to Hungarian pörkölt. It came to being around the 9th century. It is usually served with mashed potatoes or various forms of noodles and dumplings, such as pyzy.

Serbia
In Serbia, goulash is eaten in most parts of the country, especially in Vojvodina, where it was probably introduced by the province's Hungarian population.  It is actually a pörkölt-like stew, usually made with beef, veal or pork, but also with game meat like venison and boar. Compulsory ingredients are meat and onions, usually in 50-50% ratio, paprika, and lard or oil, other ingredients being optional: garlic, parsley, chili pepper, black pepper, cinnamon, bell peppers, carrots, tomatoes, red wine, mushrooms, bacon. Sometimes, goulash is sweetened by adding tomato paste, sugar or dark chocolate at the very end. In Serbia, goulash is most often served with macaroni or potato mash.

Slovenia
In Slovene partizanski golaž, "partisan goulash", favored by Slovenian partisans during the Second World War, is still regularly served at mass public events. "Partisan golaž" utilizes onion in equal proportion to meat; two or more types of meat are usually used in preparing this dish. The most widespread form of golaž in home cooking is a thick beef stew that is most commonly served with mashed potatoes. As elsewhere in the wider region, Szeged goulash, usually referred to as segedin, is also a popular dish for home preparation.

United States and Canada

North American goulash, mentioned in cookbooks since at least 1914, exists in a number of variant recipes. Originally a dish of seasoned beef, core ingredients of American goulash now usually include elbow macaroni, cubed steak, ground beef or "hamburger", and tomatoes in some form, whether canned whole, as tomato sauce, tomato soup, and/or tomato paste.

See also

 Beef stew
 Abgoosht
 Beef bourguignon
 List of beef dishes
 List of pork dishes
 List of soups
 List of stews
 List of Hungarian dishes
 National symbols of Hungary
 Romani cuisine

References

Bibliography
 Gundel's Hungarian Cookbook, Karoly Gundel, Budapest, CORVINA. .

External links

 

Austrian cuisine
Beef dishes
Bosnia and Herzegovina cuisine
Croatian stews
Czech cuisine
Dutch cuisine
German cuisine
Hungarian soups
Hungarian words and phrases
Italian stews
Lithuanian cuisine
Montenegrin cuisine
National dishes
Polish stews
Pork dishes
Macedonian cuisine
Romanian cuisine
Russian cuisine
Serbian cuisine
Soviet cuisine
Slovenian cuisine
Slovak soups
Hungarian stews
Ukrainian cuisine
Albanian cuisine
Wild game dishes
Romani cuisine
American stews
Peasant food